When a Man Rides Alone is a 1919 silent film directed by Henry King and starring William Russell as a Texas Ranger near the Mexican border. Jules Furthman, using the name Stephen Fox, was the screenwriter. Additional cast members include Carl Stockdale, Olga Grey, and Lule Warrenton.

Gallery

References

1919 films
1919 Western (genre) films
1910s English-language films
Films directed by Henry King
Pathé Exchange films
Silent American Western (genre) films
1910s American films